Little Burnt Bay is a small coastal community outside Embree and Lewisporte. In 2016, the population was 281, down 4.4. percent from 2011.

Demographics 

See also
 List of communities in Newfoundland and Labrador

References

Populated coastal places in Canada
Towns in Newfoundland and Labrador